The 4 × 400 metres relay at the World Championships in Athletics has been contested by both men and women since the inaugural edition in 1983.  The competition features three formats in relation to gender: men, women, and mixed.  The 2019 edition added in the mixed competition. The format utilizes one set of heats qualifying the top 8 into a final.

The United States holds all the championship records in this event.  For both the men and women, the record has been held since 1993 with a time of 2:54.29 for the men and 3:16.71 for the women.  In the mixed competition, a time of 3:09.34 was set in 2019.  For the men and the mixed records, they are also both world records.

Medalists

Men

Medalists by country

Women

Medalists by country

Mixed

Championship record progression

Men

Finishing times

Top ten fastest World Championship times

References

External links
Official IAAF website

 
World Championships in Athletics
Events at the World Athletics Championships